Bridge is an unincorporated community in Coos County, Oregon, United States.

A post office two miles west of this locale was named "Angora" and ran from August 1883 until May 1894. There had previously been a post office named "Enchanted Prairie" from 1870 to 1883 when the name was changed to Angora and moved to the home of the new postmaster. Angora post office moved twice more, each time to the home of the current postmaster. Bridge post office was established in July 1894, named for a nearby bridge over the river. The Post Office Department did not approve reestablishing the name Angora, and later a post office by that name was established in Lincoln County. Bridge post office closed in 1945.

Bridge was stagecoach stop where horses were changed. In 1915 the town had a creamery, sawmill, gristmill, school, and a Christian Church, and in 1940 Bridge had a population of 39. As of 1990, Bridge had a store and a tavern. The Church of the Brethren owns Camp Myrtlewood south of Bridge. The Christian Church, founded in 1900, now operates as the Bridge Community Church.

References

External links
Historic images of Bridge from Salem Public Library

Unincorporated communities in Coos County, Oregon
1894 establishments in Oregon
Populated places established in 1894
Unincorporated communities in Oregon